Crown Towers is a hotel skyscraper located in the Southbank precinct of Melbourne, Australia. Built in 1997, the hotel is one of three hotels at the Crown Casino and Entertainment Complex, the others being: Crown Promenade (2003) and Crown Metropol (2010). Located on the banks of the Yarra River, it overlooks the city centre, Kings Domain, Port Phillip and Docklands.

Description 
Proposals for a Crown hotel to join the casino date back to as early as 1994, at a time when Crown casino was situated in a temporary location on the north bank of the Yarra River. Designed by Daryl Jackson and Hudson Conway, the Crown Towers hotel was completed in 1997 in Southbank, alongside the new casino complex. The 5–star hotel opened on 8 May 1997, albeit behind schedule. The hotel is the first skyscraper (building to reach at least ) to be constructed in the Southbank precinct of Melbourne, a location wherein some of the tallest buildings in the city stand.

See also 
 List of tallest buildings in Melbourne

References

External links 

Crown towers — on CTBUH Skyscraper Center

Skyscrapers in Melbourne
Hotel buildings completed in 1997
Hotels in Melbourne
Skyscraper hotels in Australia
Buildings and structures in the City of Melbourne (LGA)
1997 establishments in Australia
Southbank, Victoria